Mount Leek is a mountain standing west of Spear Glacier in the northeast part of the Hauberg Mountains, in Palmer Land, Antarctica. It was first observed from the air by the Ronne Antarctic Research Expedition, 1947–48, and was mapped by the United States Geological Survey from surveys and U.S. Navy air photos, 1961–67. It was named by the Advisory Committee on Antarctic Names for Gouke M. Leek, a glaciologist at Byrd Station, summer 1965–66.

References

Mountains of Palmer Land